Calanques de Piana ( or ) are Corsican calanques located in Piana, between Ajaccio and Calvi, in the Gulf of Porto. It is part of a UNESCO World Heritage Site that includes other sites in the Gulf of Porto, due to its beauty, rich marine biodiversity, and unique maquis shrubland. The jagged cliffs are made of red ochre.

References

External links 

 Official site
 UNESCO World Heritage Centre, Gulf of Porto: Calanche of Piana, Gulf of Girolata, Scandola Reserve

World Heritage Sites in France
Landforms of Corsica
Tourist attractions in Corse-du-Sud